{{DISPLAYTITLE:C10H15NO}}
The molecular formula C10H15NO (molar mass : 165.23 g/mol, exact mass : 165.115364) may refer to:

 Anatoxin-a
 Ephedrine
 Hordenine
 2-Methoxyamphetamine
 3-Methoxyamphetamine
 para-Methoxyamphetamine (4-methoxyamphetamine)
 Perillartine
 Pholedrine
 Pseudoephedrine
 Talsaclidine